Hina is a female name. In South Asia, it is derived from Henna. In Japan, it is derived from light or sun. In the Pacific Islands, it is derived from a goddess of various Polynesian cultures.

It may refer to:
 Hina-au-kekele, a Hawaiian lady and the wife of the chief Pilikaʻaiea
 Hina Dilpazeer Khan, Pakistani actress, model, TV host and singer
 , Japanese table tennis player
 Hina Jamelle, American architect
 Hina Jilani, Pakistani lawyer and activist
 , Japanese voice actress
 Hineuki, a Hawaiian lady whose full name was Hina–keʻuki 
 Hina Khan, Indian actress
 Hina Khawaja Bayat, Pakistani actress
 Hina Rabbani Khar, Pakistani stateswoman and economist
 Hina Saleem, a Pakistani woman killed in an honour killing in Italy
 Hina Shah, Indian entrepreneur
 Hina Shaheen, Pakistani TV, film stage actress and stage dancer
 Hina Spani, Argentine soprano
 , Japanese women's footballer
 , Japanese voice actress
 , Japanese voice actress
 , Japanese voice actress

Fictional characters
 Hina Amano, a fictional character in the film Weathering with You
 Hina Hikawa, a fictional character from the media franchise BanG Dream!
 Hina Kagiyama, a fictional character from the Touhou Project franchise
 Hina Kazim, fictional character in the film A Wedding (Noces)
 Hina Kudo, a fictional character from the South Korean TV show Mr Sunshine

See also 
 Hina (chiefess), a list of noble ladies called Hina
 Hina (goddess)

References

Japanese feminine given names
Pakistani feminine given names
Indian feminine given names